Alfred Newman Beadle V (1927–1998) was an American modernist architect active in Phoenix, Arizona.

Beadle is best known for designing Case Study Apartment #1, a three-unit apartment development known as the Triad in Phoenix, AZ, which was part of the Case Study House program of Arts & Architecture magazine.

Life and career 
Trained in construction during World War II as a Seabee, Beadle moved to Phoenix in the early 1950s and built a variety of commercial and residential projects, including an entire housing development called Paradise Gardens (though he disassociated himself from the project before it was completed), and the local landmark of the Safari Resort in Scottsdale (demolished).

His lack of an architectural license led to professional difficulties and, at one point, he was charged with practicing without a license. The state of Arizona wanted to "grandfather" him in by giving him a license, but he refused to accept it. As part of his defense, Beadle's lawyer pointed out that another local architect, one Frank Lloyd Wright, was also practicing without the proper credentials. In order to be eligible to take the test Beadle had to obtain the requisite number of apprentice hours required by Arizona. Alan A. Dailey a retired architect from New York heard of this, and specifically formed the Phoenix firm of Alan A. Dailey & Associates so Beadle could obtain the hours before taking the test. Beadle went on to take the state's test and passed.

Beadle designed and supervised the construction of the 21-story Executive Towers in 1963, at the time the tallest high rise in Phoenix.

In 1993, the Arizona State University College of Architecture and Environmental Design held a month-long exhibit on "Constructions: Buildings in Arizona by Alfred Newman Beadle". The Architecture College presented a distinguished service award to Beadle.

References
Al Beadle Estate

Modernist architects
Architects from Arizona
1927 births
1998 deaths
Seabees
Modernist architecture in Arizona
20th-century American architects
Mid-century modern
Architects from Saint Paul, Minnesota